Bajacalifornia is a genus of slickheads. It was described in 1925 by Charles Haskins Townsend and John Treadwell Nichols on the basis of Bajacalifornia burragei which was discovered in 1911 during the deep sea expedition of the research vessel USS Albatross off the coast of Todos Santos Bay at the Baja California peninsula.  In 1952 Ichthyologist Albert Eide Parr published a revision of this genus.

Species
There are currently seven recognized species in this genus:
 Bajacalifornia aequatoris Miya & Markle, 1993
 Bajacalifornia arcylepis Markle & G. Krefft, 1985 (Network slickhead)
 Bajacalifornia burragei C. H. Townsend & Nichols, 1925 (Sharpchin slickhead)
 Bajacalifornia calcarata (M. C. W. Weber, 1913) (Brown slickhead)
 Bajacalifornia erimoensis Amaoka & K. Abe, 1977
 Bajacalifornia megalops (Lütken, 1898) (Bigeye smooth-head)
 Bajacalifornia microstoma Sazonov, 1988

Description 
The body is covered with small cycloid scales. The ventral scales are well developed. The mouth is moderately wide but larger than in the genus Alepocephalus. The lower jaw is strongly projected and ends in a pointed knob which is directed obliquely forwards. The jaw edges have a single row of small teeth. The gill raker openings are wide, the gill membranes are joined below. The short dorsal and anal fins are equal in length.

Distribution
The distribution  area ranges from the Indian Ocean, the Indo-Pacific north to the Sea of Japan and eastwards to the East Pacific Rise.

References

Alepocephalidae
Taxa named by Charles Henry Tyler Townsend
Taxa named by John Treadwell Nichols
Fish described in 1925